Tossal d'en Cervera or Pic de Cervera is a mountain in Spain. It is located between the municipal terms of La Sénia, in the Montsià comarca, and  La Pobla de Benifassà, Baix Maestrat, Valencian Community.

This mountain has an elevation of 1,347.5 metres above sea level. The abandoned hamlet of Refalgarí (Rafalgarí) lies on its northern slope.

This mountain is part of the Ports de Tortosa-Beseit system and should not be confused with the Cervera Mountains located further southeast.

See also
Ports de Tortosa-Beseit
Mountains of Catalonia
Mountains of the Valencian Community
Iberian System

References

Ports de Tortosa-Beseit
Mountains of Catalonia